In enzymology, an ADP—thymidine kinase is an enzyme that catalyzes the chemical reaction

ADP + thymidine  AMP + thymidine 5'-phosphate

Thus, the two substrates of this enzyme are ADP and thymidine, whereas its two products are AMP and thymidine 5'-phosphate.

This enzyme belongs to the family of transferases, specifically those transferring phosphorus-containing groups (phosphotransferases) with an alcohol group as acceptor. The systematic name of this enzyme class is ADP:thymidine 5'-phosphotransferase. Other names in common use include ADP:dThd phosphotransferase, and adenosine diphosphate-thymidine phosphotransferase.

References

 

EC 2.7.1
Enzymes of unknown structure